The Petzval objective or Petzval lens is the first photographic portrait objective lens (with a 160mm focal length) in the history of photography. The Voigtländer company went on to build the first Petzval lens in 1840 on behalf of Petzval, whereupon it became known throughout Europe. Later, the optical instruments maker Carl Dietzler in Vienna also produced the Petzval lens.

History
The Voigtländer-Petzval objective lens was revolutionary and attracted the attention of the scientific world because it was the first mathematically calculated precision objective in the history of photography. Petzval's lens established two new features: firstly, it was faster compared to previous lenses, with a maximum aperture of 1:3.6. In comparison to Daguerre's daguerreotype camera lens of 1839, Petzval's design had 22 times the light-gathering capacity, which for the first time enabled portraits under favourable conditions with exposure times of less than a minute.

Additionally, Petzval calculated for the first time the composition of the lenses based on optical laws, whereas optics before had previously been ground and polished according to experience. For the calculations, 8 artillery gunners and 3 corporals were made available to Petzval by Archduke Louis of Austria (commander of the artillery), since the artillery was one of the few professions where mathematical calculations were made.

By 1845 Petzval's collaboration with Voigtländer, who held the license to produce the lenses, had become "mired in disputes'. Voigtländer moved production outside of Austria and therefore beyond Petzval's patent limitations. The Petzval objective was produced by Voigtländer and sold worldwide; until 1862 Voigtländer had produced 60,000 pieces.

Optical design 
The lens consisted of two doublet lenses with an aperture stop in between. The front lens is well corrected for spherical aberrations but introduces coma. The second doublet corrects for this and the position of the stop corrects most of the astigmatism. However, this results in additional field curvature and vignetting. The total field of view is therefore restricted to about 30 degrees. An f-number of 3.6 was achievable, which was considerably faster than other lenses of the time.

Lens revival
In 2013 Lomography successfully launched a crowdfunding campaign at kickstarter.com to produce a new Petzval lens in Russia for film and digital cameras.

Lensbaby offers Petzval lenses for modern cameras under the Burnside and Twist names.

William Optics produces a 51 mm F/4.9 (250 mm focal length) Petzval lens for astrophotography.

Image gallery

References

Photographic lenses
Hungarian inventions
Austrian inventions